KMF may refer to:

 Comorian franc, currency of Comoros by ISO 4217 currency code
 Kabul Medical University, formerly the Kabul Medical Faculty
 Kare language (Papuan), ISO 639-3 language code
 Karnataka Milk Federation, a state-level milk federation in India
 Kevoree Modeling Framework, a model driven engineering framework that generates code from models
 Khmer Mekong Films, a Cambodian film and video production company 
 KMF Ekonomac Kragujevac, a futsal club based in Kragujevac, Serbia
 Knightmare Frame, mecha from Sunrise anime Code Geass
 Korea Muslim Federation, a religious organization based in South Korea
 KMF, a 2016 album by Norwegian indie rock band Kakkmaddafakka